State Highway 171, abbreviated as SH-171, is a state highway in Cimarron County, Oklahoma, in the Oklahoma Panhandle. The only other highway it intersects with is US-64/412/SH-3, three miles (5 km) south of Keyes. SH-171 has no lettered spur routes.

SH-171 was established circa 1974 with its present-day routing and termini, and may have initially been numbered SH-170. It had assumed its current number by 1976.

Route description
From the southern terminus, SH-171 heads due north. As the route continues north, it passes to the east of two intermittent lakes, Ritner Lake and Sampsel Lake. The highway then comes to a junction with US-64, US-412, and SH-3; the three highways head toward Boise City to the west and Guymon to the east. SH-171 continues north, passing along the eastern edge of the town of Keyes. The route then comes to an end at US-56.

History
The route of the present-day SH-171 was first shown as a state highway on the 1975 official state map, implying its creation in 1974. On this edition of the map only, it is shown as State Highway 170. By 1976, it was shown as SH-171. The route has always been paved, and follows the same routing that it did in 1974.

Junction list

References

External links

SH-171 at OKHighways

Transportation in Cimarron County, Oklahoma
171